Carol Therese Cady (born June 6, 1962, in Los Alamos, New Mexico) is a retired female shot putter and discus thrower from the United States. She competed for her native country at two consecutive Summer Olympics, starting in 1984. During the 1980s Cady was one of the first women to compete in hammer throw.  Cady was on the track team while a student at Stanford University.

International competitions

References

1962 births
Living people
Sportspeople from New Mexico
Track and field athletes from California
American female shot putters
American female discus throwers
American female hammer throwers
Olympic track and field athletes of the United States
Athletes (track and field) at the 1984 Summer Olympics
Athletes (track and field) at the 1988 Summer Olympics
World Athletics Championships athletes for the United States
Stanford Cardinal women's track and field athletes
People from Los Alamos, New Mexico